Gabrielle Sunshine Miller (born November 9, 1973) is a Canadian actress who, since the start of her career in 1993, has appeared in many television films and series episodes, including leading roles in two of Canada's most popular concurrently-running series, the sitcom Corner Gas (2004–09) and the comedy-drama Robson Arms (2005–08). She was also a regular or semi-regular on the TV series Pasadena (2002), Alienated (2003–04), Call Me Fitz (2012–13), Mother Up! (2013) and Good Witch (2015–16).

Career
She was a cast member of the Canadian television series Corner Gas, for which she won a shared Gemini Awards for Best Ensemble Performance in a Comedy Program or Series in 2007 and two Leo Awards for Best Performance or Host in a Music, Comedy, or Variety Program or Series (2005 and 2006).

She is also featured in the CTV series Robson Arms for which she won another Leo Award for Best Supporting Performance by a Female 
in a Dramatic Series in 2007. The limited-length seasons of both programs allowed her to appear in both series simultaneously.

Miller also had a recurring role on the television series Alienated during 2004, giving her the rare distinction of starring in three ongoing series during the same calendar year.

Miller's TV and film career dates back to 1993, and she has appeared in a variety of Canadian and American productions, including Highlander: The Series (where she played two different roles), The X-Files (where she played two different roles), Stargate SG-1, UC: Undercover, Outer Limits and Frasier. In 2002, she was a cast member on the short-lived American drama series Breaking News. She also made appearances on Sliders as Fling, and NCIS as Andrea Mavrey.

She is also a sponsor of World Vision Canada.

Filmography

Film

Television

Awards and nominations

References

External links 

Gabrielle Miller official website

NorthernStars.ca - Gabrielle Miller profile
2009 Interview on Toro Magazine

1973 births
Actresses from Vancouver
Canadian television actresses
Living people
Canadian film actresses
Canadian voice actresses
20th-century Canadian actresses
21st-century Canadian actresses
Best Supporting Actress in a Drama Series Canadian Screen Award winners